War Hunt is a 1962 war film directed by Denis Sanders and starring John Saxon, Robert Redford and Charles Aidman. Produced by Terry Sanders for T-D Enterprises, and released by United Artists, the film features the film debuts of Sydney Pollack and Tom Skerritt and the first major role for Redford. Redford and Pollack met on the set of the film as actors.

The National Board of Review named the film as one of the ten best films of 1962.  It won the Silver Sail best feature film award at the 1962 Locarno International Film Festival and was nominated for a UN BAFTA award in 1964.

Plot
Near the end of the Korean War, a replacement, Private Loomis, is assigned to an infantry company on the front line. One night, Loomis notices a soldier leaving camp in dark clothing and face paint. He learns that this is Private Endore, who routinely infiltrates enemy lines. The company's commander, Captain Pratt, allows Endore to act independently because, after many of these nighttime excursions, he has returned with useful information. However, Endore is also knifing to death enemy soldiers and, as Loomis himself witnesses during a night patrol, conducts an odd circle-ritual around each of his murdered victims. The other men in the company steer clear of Endore and warn Loomis, who is prone to asking probing questions, not to "mess with that guy".

Endore's only friend is a Korean orphan, nicknamed Charlie, with whom Loomis tries to cultivate a friendship. He suggests to Endore that the boy should be placed in an orphanage where he will at least have other children around and some kind of basic lifestyle.  This brings Loomis into conflict with a demonstrably psychotic Endore, who plans to remain in Korea after the war ends, and to keep Charlie with him.

The tension comes to a head when the armistice occurs. Endore, in direct defiance of company orders, once more dons dark clothing and takes Charlie to cross enemy lines. Loomis, alarmed that this could impact the armistice, approaches his company sergeant Van Horn (Pollack) about Endore. The two soldiers are forced to bring Endore's actions to Pratt's attention. Pratt, realizing he has let Endore have too free a hand, asks the men for volunteers to bring Endore back, but only Loomis and Van Horn agree to join him.

The group finally locates Endore, who has taken Charlie behind enemy lines and resists Pratt's orders to return. Endore grabs a knife and attempts to attack Pratt after beating up Van Horn. Despite Loomis' pleas, Pratt shoots the deranged Endore and Charlie flees in the ensuing confusion. The resolution suggests that Charlie, having been influenced and given lessons in killing by Endore, will grow into the same kind of man.

Cast
John Saxon as Private Raymond Endore
Robert Redford as Private Roy Loomis
Charles Aidman as Captain Wallace Pratt
Sydney Pollack as Sergeant Owen Van Horn
Tommy Matsuda as Charlie
Gavin MacLeod as Private Crotty
Anthony Ray as Private Joshua Fresno
Tom Skerritt as Sergeant Stan Showalter
William Challee as Lieutenant Colonel
Nancy Hsueh as Mama San
Francis Ford Coppola as Truck Driver

Production
The film was shot in 15 days for US$250,000. Francis Ford Coppola drove a truck in the film and associate producer Noel Black worked as an electrician. The Sanders brothers, who started in Hollywood as second unit directors of the river sequences in The Night of the Hunter, shot most of the film at night to hide their low budget.

Producer Terry Sanders sent the script to the Pentagon in the chance that the military might provide assistance. The Army replied that it objected to many portions of the script such as a private soldier being an independent professional killer with his commanding officer's approval, a scene of the captain calling a sergeant an "idiot", and scenes the Army thought "too gruesome to be in good taste".

John Saxon was top billed but the film is best remembered for Robert Redford's appearance.

Reception
Bosley Crowther of The New York Times called the film "one of the most original and haunting war movies in years" and said "most of this picture is pure unvarnished gold".

See also
 List of American films of 1962

References

External links

1962 films
1962 war films
1960s English-language films
American war films
Korean War films
American black-and-white films
Films directed by Denis Sanders
United Artists films
Films set in Korea
Films set in 1953
American neo-noir films
1960s American films